The University of Nicosia was established in 1980 and its main campus is located in Nicosia, the capital city of Cyprus. It also runs study centres in Athens, Bucharest and New York.

The university comprises the School of Business, School of Education, School of Humanities and Social Sciences, School of Law, Medical School, and the School of Sciences and Engineering. It offers more than 100 conventional on-campus and online/distance learning programs of study at the Bachelor, Master, and Doctorate level.

In offering some of its programmes, the university holds partnerships with the St George's, University of London, Aristotle University of Thessaloniki, University of Peloponnese, University of Patras, Hellenic Open University, University of Padova, University of Zagreb, Western Sydney University, and MGIMO University.

In 2014, UNIC became the first university in the world to offer a Master of Science in Blockchain & Digital Currency and the first educational institution to accept Bitcoin for tuition payment. As of the graduating class of Spring 2017, UNIC publishes all diplomas of its graduating students (Bachelor, Master, doctoral degrees) on the Bitcoin blockchain, offering instant online verification of degree authenticity.

In 2022, the University of Nicosia was ranked 500–601st among global universities, 301–400th in impact, and 179th among young universities by Times Higher Education. The university is also ranked 136th in Emerging Europe and the Central Asia (EECA) Region by the QS World University Rankings. Moreover, UNIC is the first university in the European Union to receive a 5-star rating for Online/Distance Learning from QS.

Campus 

UNIC's campus is made up of 20 buildings across the suburb of Engomi, Nicosia. Over €100 million has been invested into the campus infrastructure in the past few years. In line with its strategy for internationalization, the university has also established regional offices around the world, including New York, London, Tel Aviv and Athens.

Schools and programmes 

UNIC is composed of 6 schools, namely the School of Business, School of Education, School of Humanities and Social Sciences, School of Law, the Medical School and the School of Sciences and Engineering.

The School of Business organisationally consists of the following departments: 
 Department of Management and MIS
 Department of Marketing
 Department of Hospitality, Tourism and Sports Management
 Department of Economics and Finance
 Department of Accounting
 MBA Programme

The School of Education consists of the following departments:
 Department of Education
 Department of Music and Dance

The School of Humanities and Social Sciences has six departments, offering graduate and undergraduate programmes:
 Department of Languages and Literature
 Department of Social Sciences
 Department of Design and Multimedia
 Department of Communication
 Department of Architecture
 Department of Theology

The School of Law consists of two principal departments, namely: 
 Department of Law
 Department of European Studies and International Relations

UNIC started the first medical programme in Cyprus in 2011.

The School of Sciences and Engineering consists of three departments, namely:
 Department of Computer Science
 Department of Engineering
 Department of Life and Health Sciences

Teaching and learning 

UNIC is an entrepreneurial digital university and both its core educational services (delivery of learning) and its administrative support operations employ advanced Information Communication Technology. The university's international teaching and research faculty are involved in European and locally funded research projects, and collaborate with local and international industries.

Distance learning 

UNIC offers distance learning programmes at Bachelor and Master level. The university's approach to e-learning draws on the detailed recommendations made in (1) the Higher Education Funding Council for England's (HEFCE) revised approach to e-learning strategy for enhancing learning and teaching through the use of technology and (2) the UK Quality Assurance Agency (QAA) for Higher Education 2010 Amplified Version Strategy for flexible and distributed learning.

The University of Nicosia has been awarded the following accolades for e-learning and distance learning education excellence.

QS Stars Label

The University of Nicosia is the first university in Europe to receive a 5-star rating for Online/Distance Learning. This distinction was awarded following an assessment by the QS Intelligence Unit, a leading, independent, global university-rating agency.

EADTU E-xcellence Award

The university was also awarded the “E-xcellence Label”, by the European Association of Distance Teaching Universities (EADTU), Europe's leading institutional association in Online, Open and Flexible Higher Education, and is at the heart of the modernisation agenda of European universities.

EFQUEL Certification

The university has been awarded the “UNIQUe Certification for Quality in e-learning and Excellence in use of ICT in Higher Education”, by the European Foundation for Quality in e-Learning (EFQUEL). The award was based on the quality standards, as well as the strategy, infrastructure, expertise and human resources required for the excellent delivery of distance learning/e-learning programmes.

Founding 

Intercollege was founded in 1980 by a team of academics and senior executives under the direction of Mr Stelios Zarafopoulos (BA, DMS, MCIM, FCAM), in order to prepare students for the examinations of recognized British professional bodies, such as the Chartered Institute of Marketing (CIM) and the Communication, Advertising and Marketing Foundation (CAM).

In 1981 Dr Sofronis Sofroniou (BA, MA, MSc, PHD), one of the founding members,  is appointed as president and its senior executive. The college began expanding its programs towards academic degrees. In its first decade of operation, Intercollege developed and modified courses of study in accordance with the college's growing constituencies, the needs of the Cypriot labor market. First international students join the college. Internal Certificates (after one year of studies) and Diplomas (after two years of study) are offered in programmes such as Business Administration, Hotel Management, Marketing, Public Relations, and Advertising.

To this end, Intercollege prepared students for the College Level Examination Program (CLEP) examinations, which were accepted by the University of the State of New York and the Thomas Edison State College towards their external degrees. Through hard work and persistence, the college has steadily developed into a respected Cypriot college that awards its own diplomas, bachelor's and master's degrees on three campuses. In September 2007, the 27-year-old college was acknowledged as a university and now uses the name University of Nicosia, Cyprus. The university continues to offer a number of professional programs such as the Association of Chartered Certified Accountants (ACCA), the Certified Accounting Technician (CAT), and the Chartered Institute of Banking.

Dr Nicos Peristianis is appointed as Director.

Important milestones 

1980

Intercollege of Management and Communication Studies (IMCS) was founded as a tertiary level institution offering the programs of various British professional bodies such as the Communication, Advertising and Marketing Foundation (CAM), the Chartered Institute of Marketing (CIM) and the Association of Business Executives (ABE).

1981

 Dr Sofronis Sofroniou as one of its founding members is also  appointed as  its first President,  a position held for over 35 years. First international students join the college.
 Internal certificates (after one year of study) and diplomas (after two years of study) are offered in programs such as business administration, hotel management, marketing, public relations, and advertising.

1982

 Tuition is provided for the University of the State of New York (USNY) external degrees through recognized external exams, such as the College Level Examination Program (CLEP) and the Proficiency Examination Program (PEP), for which Intercollege becomes a testing center.
 Intercollege moves to new, larger premises.

1983

Introduction of internal bachelor's degree programs in majors such as hotel management, business administration, and liberal arts.

 Computer science leading to internal qualification and the British professional program of IDPM (Institute of Data Processing Management) is introduced.

1984

 Intercollege students begin transferring to accredited universities: e.g. University of Maryland (Hotel Management), University of Strathclyde (postgraduate diploma in business administration).
 The Thomas Edison State College external degree program is offered.
 The Chartered Association of Certified Accountants (ACCA) program is introduced.

1985

 Andreas Polemitis joins Intercollege, merging his institute (which offered University of Indianapolis qualifications) with the college.
 University of Indianapolis programs in business administration and business data processing are introduced.
 Professional training courses subsidised by the Industrial Training Authority are offered.
 The Association of Accounting Technicians (AAT) British professional program begins.
 The Secretarial Studies program is offered.

1986

 Travel and Tourism program, modelled on IATA and British Airways training programs, is introduced. It is the first such program to be offered in Cyprus.
 Intercollege programs adopt pattern sheets. All programs are adapted to the American higher education system to include general education requirements. The semester and credit system is adopted.
 The University of Indianapolis MBA program is offered – the first MBA to be offered in Cyprus.
 Intercollege establishes the Limassol Campus.

1987

 The Nursery Education Diploma program commences with the recognition of the Ministry of Labor Department of Welfare, under the supervision of Mr Andreas Christodoulides, Dean of Administration.
 The Computer Engineering program is offered.
 Intercollege Limassol Campus moves to its present location.

1988

 Intercollege Larnaca Campus begins operation after merging with a small local college.

1989

 The Cyprus Review, an Intercollege scholarly social science journal, begins to be published.
 Intercollege adopts the CYCOM SBS Accounting package of Coopers & Lybrand.
 The Design program is set up.
 Local area networks are introduced in Nicosia and subsequently at the other campuses.
 The Brunel University/Henley College distance learning MBA is offered at the college.
 The Trenton State College MEd. is offered at the Intercollege Larnaca Campus.

1990

 AIMS (Academic Information Management System), a computerized registrations system is adopted replacing previous versions.

1991

 Registration of Intercollege programs with the Ministry of Education
 The MBA of Netherlands International Institute of Management (RVB) is introduced (substituting for the University of Indianapolis MBA)
 The Kindergarten Teacher program begins, originally at the Limassol Campus, and one year later at the Nicosia Campus.
 Intercollege degree in Hotel Management secures exemptions from the British professional body Hotel, Catering and Institutional Management (HCIMA).
 10,000 book donation from the University of Indianapolis
 The Law program is launched.

1993

 Intercollege becomes a candidate for accreditation.
 TINLIB, a high technology library database program is adopted at the Nicosia campus.
 Relocation of the Nicosia campus to large new facility in Nicosia.

1994

 The Self Study is submitted and accreditation visits are made during the months of February to April.
 Accounting Tutors (AT), a new and upcoming accounting school, amalgamates with Intercollege.

1995

 First nationwide process of accreditation collapses due to legal technicalities.
 Inauguration of the new premises in Nicosia with the first graduation ceremony held there.
 Intercollege Press begins publishing scholarly books about Cyprus covering social, political and economic aspects of the island.
 Intercollege initiates a European process of accreditation through the National Council for Educational Awards (NCEA) of the Republic of Ireland.
 Experience from three accreditation processes highlights the importance of research, publications and higher caliber faculty, factors that gain a new prominence when hiring new staff. Existing faculty are encouraged to upgrade their qualifications.
 The Cine Studio starts operations showing quality films.

1996

 Intercollege becomes regionally accredited by the NCA (North Central Association), in conjunction with the University of Indianapolis to offer associate, bachelor's and master's degrees.
 Development of Exelixis software, a registration and database system, commissioned by the college to replace AIMS.
 On-line link with Internet and E-mail Facility.
 TV/Radio Studio upgraded to better serve the needs of the Communications program.
 The Research and Development Center participates in several Med Campus Conferences.

1997

 Intercollege receives program accreditation by the National Council for Educational Awards (NCEA).
 Intercollege goes through the demanding process of local accreditation.
 New graduate programs in Psychology and International Relations are approved.
 One student achieves first-place ranking in the world in certified accounting. Another student completes the certified accounting program in two years.
 Intercollege has students including 613 international students.
 21 of 28 students pass the ACCA final examinations. Of these students, 8 are ranked amongst the top 20 students in the world in Paper 12, 2 in Paper 13 and 5 in Paper 14.
 Two new books – "The Political Economy of a Federal Cyprus" and "Security and Cooperation in Eastern Mediterranean" are published.

1998

 In the first results of local accreditation, 79 programs are accredited island-wide. 35 of these programs are offered by Intercollege.
 The business program is accredited at all levels by the European Council for Business Education (ECBE).
 The number of students reaches with 613 international students.
 An Intercollege student is awarded a medal for achieving results that rank him as one of the top three students in the world in the ACCA final examinations.

1999

 The library relocates to a separate facility.
 The graduation ceremony is broadcast live on the Internet.
 Intercollege enrollment exceeds students.
 The Pre-Medicine program is launched.
 Intercollege offers ACCA courses in Greece, Poland, Bulgaria and Poland.

2000

 Bachelor's degrees in business administration, computer science, computer engineering, hospitality (hotel) management, pre-primary education and communications are accredited. This raises the number of accredited programs to 49 (out of the 118 accredited programs on the island).
 The new Millennium Building, with six amphitheatres, a large cafeteria, and office and classroom space is completed.
 Research output amounts to 120 refereed journal papers, 200 proceedings, over 50 other journal publications, over 300 other presentations and over 50 book contributions.

2001

 The first rector of Intercollege, Van Coufoudakis, is appointed.
 Four new schools are created: the School of Business, the School of Sciences and Engineering, the School of Education, and the School of Humanities, Social Sciences and Law.
 Departments with heads are set up to substitute the program coordinators.
 Student enrolment rose by 1000 students raising the total number to 3,500 including 750 international students.
 Intercollege is the only authorised college by the CIB and the UMIST to teach the syllabus for the CIB/UMIST degree in Financial Services.
 Intercollege sets up a Unit of Environmental Studies, together with Ecognosia, and a Center for Applied Research.
 The research output includes 5 books, 52 refereed journal papers, 93 conference proceedings, 7 book chapters and 10 art exhibitions.
 Intercollege creates a Business Development Unit, which incorporates the Consultancy Unit, the Training and Development Unit and the European Programs.
 In athletics, Intercollege win 1st place in Handball and 2nd place in Football, Basketball, and Volleyball in the Intercollegiate Tournaments.

2002

 Intercollege submits to the Minister of Education the Articles of Association for the creation of a non-profit institution that will seek university status.
 Total enrolment reached 3900.
 The Rector of Intercollege and four new Deans complete their first year of service.
 The Senate of Intercollege is set as the top academic body and begins functioning.
 Number of international students: 846 from 52 countries.
 Intercollege has a total staff of 415 including 160 full-time faculty, 128 part-time faculty and 127 administrative and support staff. Included are 90 faculty members that hold a PhD.
 Research output this year includes 6 books, 7 monographs, and 17 chapters in books, 74 journal papers and 68 conference proceedings.
 Externally funded research amounting to CYP 430,000 comes from the Institute for the promotion of research, UNOPS, the 5th Framework, the Leonardo da Vinci and the Youth or Europe programs.
 Intercollege has training centers in Athens and Salonica, claiming 95% of the market in professional training (Certified Accounting, Chartered Financial Analysts, Institute of Bankers, and Certified Internal Auditors).
 Intercollege creates the Mediterranean Institute of Gender Studies, the Center for Sustainable Development, a Business Incubator Unit and a Unit for Distance and Work-Based Learning.
 Seven faculty members and collaborators had seven books published, six of these are published by the Intercollege Press.
 The Radio and TV Unit has produced TV clippings for the Red Cross, the Telethon, the Doctors of the World, and the Anti-Cancer Society and the Movement of Non-Smokers.
 New programs in English Language and Literature and a graduate program in special education get started.

2003

 The B.A. and M.A. degrees in international relations got accredited. This is the first graduate degree ever accredited in any college in Cyprus.
 The Office of Research has been set up to direct and coordinate research, particularly externally funded research.
 Also, the Center for Leisure, Sports Research and Development was set up. This is the only one of its kind in the region.
 Finally, the Helix Business Incubator Unit was set up. The unit is funded by the Ministry of Commerce and Industry to help start innovative businesses.

2004

 The MBA degree got accredited. Intercollege becomes the only college in Cyprus that has two graduate programs accredited.
 A third academic building, the Europa Building, has been completed and inaugurated in May. The Building has six amphitheaters, offices, classrooms and the bookshop.
 Intercollege started in September the KESY Counselling Center in a modern building near the U.S. Embassy. The center is staffed by professional clinical psychologists and offers counselling services to the public.

2005

 KYSATS approved three distance learning programs offered through Intercollege: the M.Sc. in Business Information Technology by Middlesex U.; the MBA of Henley Management College; the Master of Laws of the U. of London; and the Masters and Doctorate in Sport Management of the U.S. Sports Academy.
 Intercollege has received the UNESCO Chair in Multicultural Education. There is only one UNESCO chair in Greece at the U. of Thessaloniki and one in Cyprus, the one received by Intercollege.
 The Law providing for the establishment of Private Universities passed the Parliament in July.

2007

 September, 2007, Intercollege becomes the University of Nicosia, Cyprus.

2009

 Entrepreneurial Excellence Awards 2009 – The University of Nicosia wins recognition for excellence in educational services from the Cyprus Employers and Industrialists Federation.

2011

 The University of Nicosia starts the first medical programme in Cyprus by offering the St George's, University of London Bachelor of Medicine and Bachelor of Surgery (MBBS) graduate-entry programme.

2013

 Becomes the first university in the world to accept bitcoins to pay tuition.

2015

 Professor Philippos Pouyioutas is elected Rector of the University of Nicosia
 Professor Nicos Kartakoullis is elected President of the Council of the University of Nicosia

2016

 Antonis Polemitis is appointed CEO of the University of Nicosia

2018

 The University of Nicosia is ranked by QS World University Rankings, placing #91 in the Emerging Europe and Central Asia (EECA) Region.
 The University of Nicosia expands its campus by launching its official UNIC Residences - three buildings (SIX, U and TRIANGLE)

2019

 The first ever Times Higher Education (THE) University Impact Rankings, released on 3 April 2019, rank the University of Nicosia among the top 301+ universities globally in terms of their social and economic impact.

Notable alumni 
 Pieros Sotiriou, professional football player
 Emannuel Dimont, founder and Chief Data Scientist of EADX, Ph.D. recipient from Harvard University
 Irene Charalambidou, Member of the House of Representatives
 Elie Mechantaf, retired Lebanese professional basketball player

Noted Scholar Visit
Distinguished Fulbright scholar and a  world-renowned professor of Negotiation, Conflict Resolution, and Peacebuilding Dr. Nancy D. Erbe visited the university in 2009 and taught International Relations.

References

External links 
 Group in Telegram
 Country Manager (India) – University of Nicosia

 
Coordinates on Wikidata
Education in Nicosia
Private universities and colleges
Universities and colleges in Cyprus
Educational institutions established in 1980
1980 establishments in Cyprus